AbCellera Biologics Inc. is a Vancouver, British Columbia-based biotechnology firm that researches and develops human antibodies. The company is best known for its leading role in the Pandemic Prevention Platform, a project of DARPA's Biological Technologies Office. AbCellera utilizes a proprietary technology platform, which they claim can develop "medical countermeasures within 60 days." Its platform for single-cell screening was initially developed at the University of British Columbia.

History 
AbCellera was founded in 2012 by biomedical researchers Carl Hansen, Véronique Lecault, Kevin Heyries, Daniel Da Costa and Oleh Petriv. In November 2016, the company received a 645K grant from the Bill & Melinda Gates Foundation to develop a test for tuberculosis. In September 2018, a $10M series A round of funding was closed. In May 2020, a $105M series B round of funding was closed.

In January 2017, AbCellera announced that it would be collaborating with Pfizer to discover and develop antibodies against "undisclosed membrane protein targets.”

COVID-19 and expansion 
In June 2020, AbCellera announced it had begun the world's first study of a potential antibody treatment against COVID-19, with a Phase 1 trial of LY-CoV555 (Bamlanivimab), in collaboration with Eli Lilly and Company. The drug was granted an Emergency Use Authorization by the U.S. Food and Drug Administration in November 2020, and subsequently renewed in February and March 2021. The EUA was revoked in April 2021, with the FDA citing an updated conclusion that "the known and potential benefits of bamlanivimab alone no longer outweigh the known and potential risks for the product," because of significantly reduced efficacy against emerging variants of SARS-CoV-2. In November 2020, Peter Thiel joined AbCellera's board of directors and disclosed a 5.3% stake in the company.

In September 2021, the company announced a multi-year agreement with Moderna to develop mRNA-based antibody treatments against multiple diseases.

In January 2022, the company received a $1.5 million grant from the Bill & Melinda Gates Foundation to identify monoclonal antibodies against respiratory syncytial virus (RSV). A second COVID-19 monoclonal antibody therapy (Bebtelovimab) was given Emergency Use Authorization in February 2022, with the U.S. Government committing to a $720 million purchase of up to 600,000 doses.

Other partnerships include collaborations with Ablynx, Gilead Sciences, GlaxoSmithKline, Merck, Novartis, Sanofi and Teva Pharmaceutical Industries.

See also 

 Therapure BioPharma Inc

 ConjuChem

References 

Biotechnology companies of Canada
Companies listed on the Nasdaq
Canadian companies established in 2012
Companies based in Vancouver